Giovanni Battista Bertani (1516–1576) was an Italian painter and architect of the late Renaissance period. He trained with Giulio Romano in Mantua, and was promoted after Romano's death to the post of prefect of the ducal studio (fabbriche).  Painters who assisted him over the years include his brother Domenico, as well as Giovanni Battista del Moro, Geronimo Mazzuola, Paolo Farinato, Domenico Brusasorci, Giulio Campi, and Paolo Veronese. He is said to have completed a partial translation of the work of Vitruvius.

References

External links

The engravings of Giorgio Ghisi, a full text exhibition catalog from The Metropolitan Museum of Art, which contains material on Giovanni Battista Bertani (see index)

16th-century Italian painters
Italian male painters
Italian Renaissance painters
Painters from Mantua
Year of death unknown
1516 births